The Night Train to Kathmandu is a 1988 television film starring Milla Jovovich, Eddie Castrodad  and Pernell Roberts. It was directed by Robert Wiemer.

Plot summary
Lily is forced to leave her home in Princeton, New Jersey with her parents and brother to travel to Nepal. She is unhappy that she had to leave her own country and her old life behind to visit this mystic country with her family. Once there, however, she meets a mysterious Sherpa named Joharv and falls in love with him and the country. Joharv leads Lily as well as her brother and her anthropologist father to search for the legendary invisible "City That Never Was" against the backdrop of the Himalayas.

Main cast
 Milla Jovovich as Lily McLeod
 Eddie Castrodad  as Prince Joharv
 Pernell Roberts as Prof. Harry Hadley-Smithe
 Kavi Raz as Prof. Dewan Godbothe
 Trevor Eyster (credited as Tim Eyster) as Andrew McLeod
 Robert Stoeckle as Jeff McLeod
 Jan Pessano as Maureen McLeod
 Santos Pant as Ravi

Home media
The film has been released on VHS and digital formats.

References

External links

1988 films
1980s adventure films
Paramount Pictures films
1980s English-language films
1988 romantic drama films
Rail transport films
Films about interracial romance
Films set in Nepal